Hamza Humo (30 December 1895 – 19 January 1970) was a Bosnian poet, dramatist, and writer of short novels. His nephew Avdo Humo was a communist politician in Yugoslavia.

Early life
Humo was born on 30 December 1895 in Mostar into a Bosniak family . He finished elementary school, gymnasium and maktab in Mostar.

At the beginning of the First World War, Humo was drafted into the Austrian army, due to the fact that Bosnia and Herzegovina had been a part of Austria-Hungary for over 30 years at that point. He served as an interpreter and clerk in a hospital, in Győr, Hungary.

Writing
After the war he returned to Mostar, and enrolled at the University of Zagreb's Faculty of Art History. His life path later took him to Vienna, then to Belgrade. Humo's first published work was Nutarnji život (Inner Life) in 1919. He became the editor of Zabavnik in 1923. Humo also served as an editor for the magazine Gajret from 1923 until 1931.

Later life
Humo spent World War II in the village Cim by Mostar. From 1945 he regulated the Bosniak newspaper Nova doba (New Age), and subsequently worked as an editor of Radio Sarajevo and Director of the Art Gallery.

Bibliography

Nutarnji život (1919)
Strasti (1923)
Grad rima i ritmova (1924)
Sa ploča istočnih (1925)
Grozdanin kikot (1927)
Pod žrvnjem vremena (1928)
Od prelaza na Islam do novih vidika (1928)
Slučaj Raba slikara (1930)
Pripovijetke (1932)
Ljubav na periferiji (1936)
Zgrada na ruševinama (193)
Za Tita (1946)
Pjesme (1946)
Hasan opancar (1947)
Adem Čabrić (1947)
Poema o Mostaru (1949)
Tri svijeta (1951)
Perišićeva ljubav (1952)
Izabrane pjesme (1954)
Hadžijin mač (1955)
Sabrana djela (1976)
Jablan do neba (1980)
Izbor iz djela (1982)

References

1895 births
1970 deaths
Writers from Mostar
20th-century poets
Bosniak writers
Bosniak poets
Yugoslav writers
Yugoslav poets
Bosnia and Herzegovina writers
Bosnia and Herzegovina poets